Stenochironomus is a genus of European non-biting midges in the subfamily Chironominae of the bloodworm family Chironomidae.

Species
S. aestivalis Townes, 1945
S. albipalpus Borkent, 1984
S. annettae Borkent, 1984
S. bisetosus Borkent, 1984
S. browni Townes, 1945
S. cinctus Townes, 1945
S. colei (Malloch, 1919)
S. fascipennis (Zetterstedt, 1838)
S. fuscipatellus Borkent, 1984
S. gibbus (Fabricius, 1794)
S. hibernicus (Edwards, 1929)
S. hilaris (Walker, 1848)
S. innocuus Williston, 1896
S. macateei (Malloch, 1915)
S. maculatus Borkent, 1984
S. niger Borkent, 1984
S. poecilopterus (Mitchell, 1908)
S. pulchripennis (Coquillett, 1902)
S. ranzii Rossaro, 1982
S. totifuscus Sublette, 1960
S. unictus Townes, 1945
S. woodi Borkent, 1984

References

Chironomidae
Diptera of Europe